Sun Herong (born July 1957) is a lieutenant general of the Chinese People's Liberation Army Air Force (PLAAF). He has been commander of the Eastern Theater Command Air Force and deputy commander of the Eastern Theater Command since February 2016. Prior to that, he served as commander of the Jinan Military Region Air Force and deputy commander of the Jinan MR from 2012 to 2016.

Biography
Sun Herong was born in July 1957 in Guangrao, Shandong Province. He graduated from the PLA Air Force Engineering University.

Sun was deputy chief of staff of Shenyang Military Region Air Force (2003–2006) and commander
of the Dalian Forward Headquarters (2007). In June 2007 he was transferred to the Nanjing Military Region Air Force as deputy chief of staff. He became chief of staff of the Jinan Military Region Air Force in May 2009, and deputy commander in August 2011. In December 2012, he was promoted to commander of the Jinan Military Region Air Force and deputy commander of the Jinan MR. In February 2016, during Central Military Commission chairman Xi Jinping's military reform, Sun was appointed commander of the Eastern Theater Command Air Force and deputy commander of the newly established Eastern Theater Command.

Sun attained the rank of major general in July 2005, and lieutenant general (zhong jiang) in July 2014. He is a member of the 12th National People's Congress.

Book
In 2003, Sun Herong and Yi Xiaoguang co-authored the highly acclaimed book The Stealth Aircraft: A Difficult Adversary. The work proved popular with the PLAAF, then in the midst of examining high-tech warfare.

References

1957 births
Living people
People's Liberation Army generals from Shandong
People's Liberation Army Air Force generals
Delegates to the 12th National People's Congress
People from Dongying